Eva Marisol Gutowski (also known as "MyLifeasEva") is an American YouTube influencer and actress with 11.4 million subscribers on Youtube. She graduated from Brea Olinda High School in Brea, California. She also attended California State University at Fullerton. She was ranked #4 in Varietys Famechangers Digital Star Ranking list. People termed her YouTube's fastest growing star. She has also been included in Billboards Social Media Stars list. In mid 2016, she played herself but was titled as "The Journalist" in the first season of Escape the Night in a main role and returned briefly in the second season's pilot episode. She is the author of a lifestyle and advice book titled My Life as Eva: The Struggle is Real. She also starred in a YouTube Red web series called Me and My Grandma that premiered on Gutowski's Youtube channel on March 22, 2017.

In August 2017, MTV announced that Gutowski would join the revamped Total Request Live as part of a rotating social media correspondent position alongside fellow YouTubers, Gabbie Hanna, and Gigi Gorgeous.

In 2019, she appeared in a PETA ad, protesting marine parks that keep mammals and other animals imprisoned in tanks.

In 2020, she appeared in the "We the People" segment in the 2020 Democratic National Convention with her father.

Personal life
Gutowski is of African American, German, Irish, Polish, and Puerto Rican descent.

Gutowski is vegan and says she likes to do her own cooking because, "I know whatever I put into what I cook is healthy."

She went on to say, “I am ready for myself to fall in love with someone, no matter who they end up being, and have been since I was 12. Boy or girl.”

In August 2018, Gutowski announced on Twitter that her car got rear-ended by a woman texting while driving. Eva said she wasn’t in the car, but the lady was sent to the hospital, and her car got fixed 3 months later.

In 2021, Eva started releasing music under her middle name Marisol. Her first single was Hawaii.

Filmography

Bibliography

 My Life as Eva: The Struggle is Real

References

1994 births
American YouTubers
Beauty and makeup YouTubers
Bisexual women
Comedy YouTubers
Fashion YouTubers
American LGBT actors
LGBT YouTubers
Lifestyle YouTubers
Living people
California State University, Fullerton alumni
People from Brea, California
Actresses from California
American women DJs
American actresses of Puerto Rican descent
American people of German descent
American people of Irish descent
American people of Polish descent
20th-century American LGBT people
21st-century LGBT people